Lucky Lwana (born 26 December 1983) is a South African former cricketer. He played in 37 first-class and 27 List A matches for Border from 2004 to 2014.

See also
 List of Border representative cricketers

References

External links
 

1983 births
Living people
South African cricketers
Border cricketers
Sportspeople from Qonce